Rimantas Taraškevičius (18 July 1949 in the village of Biliūnai near Raseiniai, Lithuania) is a politician. He was elected mayor of Klaipėda, Lithuania in 2001.

References

  Rimantas TARAŠKEVIČIUS. Biography as published by the Seimas of Lithuania. Retrieved 2010-02-05.

1949 births
Living people
People from Raseiniai District Municipality
Mayors of places in Lithuania
Politicians from Klaipėda